Mitochondrial import inner membrane translocase subunit Tim17-A is an enzyme that in humans is encoded by the TIMM17A gene.

See also
 Mitochondria Inner Membrane Translocase
 TIMM22
 TIMM23
 TIMM44

References

Further reading

Mitochondrial proteins